Alfred Chester Nelsen Jr. (August 2, 1922 – December 25, 2018) was an American cyclist. He competed in the individual and team road race events at the 1948 Summer Olympics.

References

1922 births
2018 deaths
American male cyclists
Cyclists at the 1948 Summer Olympics
Olympic cyclists of the United States
Sportspeople from St. Louis